Iceland v Iceland Foods Ltd is an ongoing legal dispute between the country of Iceland and the British supermarket chain Iceland Foods over the trademark, intellectual property rights and use of the name "Iceland".

Trademark law already mandates some strict restrictions based on nationality in accordance with Article 3(2) of the EU Trademark Directive and Article 6 of the Paris Convention in that national flags and emblems cannot be registered as trademarks; however there is no obstacle in law to stop the name of a country becoming a trademark itself.

The supermarket first applied to the EU to trademark its name in 2002, and after several attempts was finally granted it in  2014, despite the opposition of the country of Iceland.

The dispute arose once more when the supermarket tried to stop the trademark "Inspired by Iceland" from being branded on Icelandic groceries in 2015. The supermarket attempted to stop the branding of goods with the trade mark "Íslandsstofa"; it was initially assumed this was because the trademark was its own commercial entity however it simply meant "Inspired by Iceland", therefore Iceland Foods were actually objecting to the use of the word "Iceland".

Iceland Foods Ltd has been accused by the government of Iceland of engaging in abusive behaviour by trademarking the name of the country, and of "harass[ing] Icelandic companies and even the Icelandic tourism board" by pursuing legal action against Icelandic companies which use the name of their country in their trading names.

After considering legal action in September 2016, in November 2016, the Icelandic government filed a legal challenge at the European Union Intellectual Property Office (EUIPO) to have the company's trademark invalidated "on the basis that the term 'Iceland' is exceptionally broad and ambiguous in definition, often rendering the country's firms unable to describe their products as Icelandic". The Iceland Magazine noted that "Iceland Foods was founded in 1970, but only acquired the Europe wide trademark registration of "Iceland" in 2005. According to the Sagas Iceland, the nation was established in 874. It is an insult to common sense to maintain that the supermarket chain has a stronger claim to the trademark than the country".

In response the supermarket responded by stating that they regret the country's decision to take legal action and that "do not believe that any serious confusion or conflict has ever arisen in the public mind, or is likely to do so." Furthermore, they had also accused the Icelandic government of being unwilling to negotiate a settlement despite their best attempts to do so and that the government made "unrealistic and unacceptable" demands.

In April 2019, The EUIPO invalidated the Iceland trademark. The ruling stated that the supermarket chain founded in 1970 "cannot reasonably trademark the name of a country that has been around since the 9th century".

On 9 September 2022, the EUIPO's Grand Board of Appeal held another hearing regarding the cancellation of the trademark, and the supermarket decided to return to court over the matter appealing the decision made in 2019. Iceland Foods’ managing director Richard Walker has said the supermarket will "vigorously defend its intellectual property rights".

References

Intellectual property case law
Legal history of Iceland
Trademark case law
Iceland–United Kingdom relations